General elections were held in Japan on 25 April 1947. The Japan Socialist Party won 143 of the 468 seats, making it the largest party in the House of Representatives following the election. Voter turnout was 68%. It was the last election technically held under the Meiji Constitution in preparation for the current Constitution of Japan which became effective several days later on 3 May 1947. The upper house of the Diet was also elected by the people under the new constitution, the first ordinary election of members of the House of Councillors had been held five days before.

Numerous prominent figures were elected to the House of Representatives for the first time in this election, including former Prime Minister and House of Peers member Kijuro Shidehara, then-Prime Minister and former House of Peers member Shigeru Yoshida, and future Prime Ministers Tanzan Ishibashi, Zenko Suzuki and Kakuei Tanaka.

Yoshida remained Prime Minister following the election, acting until a successor was appointed – under the new Constitution, the cabinet depends on parliamentary support and must resign in the first Diet session after a House of Representatives election.

Results

By prefecture

Aftermath

Government formation
The 1st National Diet convened on 20 May. After early coalition negotiations, Socialist Komakichi Matsuoka was elected Speaker of the lower house on 21 May, Democrat Man'itsu Tanaka Vice-Speaker. The new constitution introduced a parliamentary system of government: the prime minister became elected by and responsible to the National Diet, with the House of Representatives now being able to override the upper house. On 23 May, both houses of the Diet elected the leader of the Socialist Party, Tetsu Katayama, as prime minister – virtually unopposed as Liberals and Democrats agreed to vote for Katayama even though coalition negotiations had not yet produced final results. SCAP Douglas MacArthur welcomed the choice, thereby reducing resistance by some politicians to a Socialist-led coalition government. The Socialists initially sought a Grand Coalition with the Liberals and possibly including Democrats and Cooperativists, but the Liberals refused. Katayama eventually formed a coalition with the Democratic Party and the Kokumin Kyōdōtō (People's/National Cooperative Party), it could also count on support by the Ryokufūkai (Green Breeze Society), the largest group in the House of Councillors. Katayama was ceremonially appointed by the Emperor on 24 May, the other ministers in the Katayama Cabinet on 1 June after the conclusion of the coalition negotiations.

New government
The new government enacted several reforms sought by the SCAP, such as the dissolution of the powerful Home Ministry and anti-trust legislation to dismantle the zaibatsu. However,  internal divisions in the Socialist Party soon surfaced and led to Katayama's resignation in February 1948 when the lower house budget committee, chaired by left-wing Socialist Mosaburō Suzuki, rejected the cabinet's draft budget. After an even shorter government under Katayama's deputy, Democrat Hitoshi Ashida, the coalition collapsed, and Liberal Shigeru Yoshida returned as prime minister in October 1948 by which time the Liberals (reformed as Democratic Liberal Party in March 1948) had gained the position as first party in the lower house by defectors from the Democratic Party and independents joining, though by far not an absolute majority.

References

Japan
1947 elections in Japan
General elections in Japan
April 1947 events in Asia
Election and referendum articles with incomplete results